The Forge: Lemont Quarries Adventure Park is an adventure park that opened July, 17 2020 in Lemont, Illinois, a suburb of Chicago. It is a public-private partnership with the Village of Lemont and Lemont Township. 

It also has adventure dining, a beer garden, an event venue, and summer camps.

The park was built on disused industrial land and flooded former Lemont yellow dolomite quarries straddling the Illinois and Michigan Canal National Heritage Area, and abutting the Chicago Sanitary and Ship Canal. It is named after the Forge Quarry and uses it, the Great Lakes Quarries, and the I&M Canal as water features. It was originally scheduled to open on May 25, with a grand opening scheduled for June 27, 2020, but due to the COVID-19 pandemic this was pushed back to July 2020.

References

Adventure parks
Amusement parks in Illinois
Tourist attractions in Cook County, Illinois
Tourist attractions in DuPage County, Illinois